The Florida shuffle describes the recruitment of a drug user with good health insurance to repeatedly attend various rehab centers and sober living houses, which allows the facilities to repeatedly bill the patient's insurance company.  The treatment centers that participate in this may have little regard for the actual needs of the patient. While named after Florida, the practice also occurs in other places in the United States, such as California and Arizona, with attractive climates and locations. A treatment center can earn more than US$40,000 each time a patient goes through their program.

Description
Frequently these users are sent to various rehab centers by brokers who work on a freelance basis for the centers. Brokers will use inducements like cash payments for time spent in rehab or free airfare in order to get drug users to a particular center. They will also sometimes supply the drug users with drugs so that the user will fail a urine test, allowing them to be admitted to the rehab center. Rehab centers will also use advertising on late-night television and social media in order to find potential patients. This process can continue until the user dies.

History
The regulation of Florida rehab centers stemmed from five Florida rehab centers bills. These five bills HB 807 (SB 788), HB 249 (SB 588), HB 477, HB 557 (SB 840), and SB 866 (HB 791). This practice started after the passage of the 2010 Patient Protection and Affordable Care Act (commonly known as Obamacare or the ACA) and the 1996 Mental Health Parity Act. The ACA required insurers to pay for drug rehabilitation treatment as an essential health benefit. Rehab centers are able to bill insurance companies substantial amounts of money for routine tests, such as US$4,000 for a urinalysis test (sometimes facetiously referred to as "liquid gold") . According to insurance executives, it took several years to realize what was happening since urinalysis tests had never arisen as a billing issue before and the doctor-signed orders for the tests gave them an aura of medical authority. Many insurance companies are now cutting their reimbursement rates for drug tests.

Both federal and state legislation have been passed to attempt to curb the practice. This includes California, Florida, and the Federal government through the Eliminating Kickbacks in Recovery Act. Florida has arrested 66 people under its law. These laws have resulted in the operators of some closed rehab centers relocating to different states without regulations or laws.

References 

Drug rehabilitation
Opioids in the United States